SunTrust Center (currently being renamed under the Truist name) is a 26-story office building in Richmond, Virginia. It is the second tallest building in Richmond, and the fourth tallest in Virginia. Construction costs were relatively high due to being clad in granite.

History
Completed in 1983, it was formerly the headquarters of Crestar Bank a regional bank with branches throughout Virginia and in Maryland. Crestar was acquired by Suntrust in 2000.

The site replaces the United Virginia Bank Insurance Headquarters, which was demolished in 1981.

References

External links
 

Office buildings completed in 1983
Skyscraper office buildings in Virginia
Skyscrapers in Richmond, Virginia
1983 establishments in Virginia